U.S. Route 20 or U.S. Highway 20 (US 20) is an east–west United States Numbered Highway that stretches from the Pacific Northwest east to New England. The "0" in its route number indicates that US 20 is a major coast-to-coast route. Spanning , it is the longest road in the United States, and, in the east, the route is roughly parallel to that of the newer Interstate 90 (I-90), which is the longest Interstate Highway in the U.S. There is a discontinuity in the official designation of US 20 through Yellowstone National Park, with unnumbered roads used to traverse the park.

US 20 and US 30 break the general U.S. Route numbering rules in Oregon, since US 30 actually starts north of US 20 in Astoria, and runs parallel to the north throughout the state (the Columbia River and Interstate 84). The two run concurrently and continue in the correct positioning near Caldwell, Idaho. This is because US 20 was not a planned coast-to-coast route while US 30 was. US 20 originally ended at the eastern entrance of Yellowstone Park; it was extended in 1940.

The highway's eastern terminus is in Boston, Massachusetts, at Kenmore Square, where it meets Massachusetts Route 2. Its western terminus is in Newport, Oregon, at an intersection with US 101, within a mile of the Pacific Ocean.

Route description

Oregon

US 20 begins at an intersection with US 101 in Newport, Oregon, and runs generally eastward towards Idaho. On the way it goes over the Central Oregon Coast Range, through several Willamette Valley cities including Corvallis and Albany, climbs the Cascade Mountains over Santiam Pass, goes through Bend, and traverses the Oregon High Desert after passing through Burns. It eventually overlaps US 26 in Vale, and the two highways continue concurrently to the Idaho border.

Idaho

US 20 crosses into Idaho from Oregon northwest of Parma. It runs concurrently with US 26 and joins US 95 through Parma. US 20/US 26 leaves US 95 southeast of Parma and runs to Caldwell where US 20/US 26 joins with I-84 and US 30 for a short time. It continues into and across Camas County through Fairfield to Timmerman Junction, the intersection in Blaine County with State Highway 75, the route to Sun Valley, Galena Summit, and Stanley. US 20 continues east through Picabo and Carey, joined with US 26 and US 93, to Craters of the Moon and Arco, where US 93 splits off and turns north-northwest to climb the Big Lost River valley. US 20/US 26 continues on through the Idaho National Laboratory, where the highways split just west of Atomic City; US 26 heads to Blackfoot and US 20 to Idaho Falls, where it turns north-northeast to pass near Rexburg as a freeway.

Montana

It runs from the Idaho state line to West Yellowstone, Montana, the western entrance to Yellowstone National Park. US 20 is known as the Targhee Pass Highway in Montana.

While US 20 and other U.S. Routes are officially discontinuous through the park, some commercially produced maps show these highways running inside Yellowstone National Park itself along its unnumbered roads and across the Montana–Wyoming state line.

Wyoming

In the state of Wyoming, the eastern segment of US 20 starts at the eastern entrance to Yellowstone National Park along with the western termini of US 14 and US 16. These three routes run east to Greybull, where US 14 continues east and US 16/US 20 turns south; at Worland, US 16 turns east while US 20 continues south, passing through Wind River Canyon south of Thermopolis. US 20 joins US 26 in Shoshoni, where it turns east, and they continue all the way through Casper. From Casper, the two highways parallel I-25 and US 87 for 26 miles, until all four link up together just southeast of Glenrock. These four routes stay combined to Orin, where US 20 turns east from I-25, at the western end of US 18. US 18 and US 20 are concurrent from Orin to Lusk, where US 18 turns north and US 20 continues east into Nebraska.

Nebraska

Within Nebraska, US 20 is a state highway that begins on the Wyoming–Nebraska state line west of Harrison near the Niobrara River and runs to the Nebraska–Iowa state line in South Sioux City. Throughout its  length the route passes through a diverse range of landscapes including bluffs and escarpments in the Northwest Panhandle, the Nebraska Sandhills in the northern part of the state, and rolling hills and plains as the highway approaches the Missouri River valley south of Sioux City, Iowa. Throughout its length, US 20 is a two-lane highway with the exception of the easternmost  which is four-lane divided highway, the last  of which is concurrent with Interstate 129.

Iowa

US 20 enters Iowa at Sioux City via the Missouri River crossing with I-129 and US 75. After skirting the southeast side of Sioux City as a freeway with US 75, US 20 continues east as an expressway to Moville. From Moville through north of Early at the junction with U.S. Route 71 and Iowa Highway 471, US 20 was reconstructed from a rural two-lane highway to a four-lane road. This segment re-opened October 19, 2018 and made it so that US 20 is a continuous four-lane highway for its entire length in Iowa. It passes to the north of Sac City, where it has another interchange with the realigned U.S. Route 71, then passes to the south of Fort Dodge and Webster City before intersecting I-35 near Williams.

A new segment of freeway between US 65 south of Iowa Falls and Iowa Highway 14 opened in 2003 creating a continuous four-lane route from Moorland to Dubuque. In the Waterloo/Cedar Falls area, the segment of US 20 overlapped by the Avenue of the Saints, which is also designated as Iowa Highway 27. US 20 passes Independence, Manchester, and Dyersville before reaching Dubuque. At Dubuque, US 20 crosses into Illinois over the Julien Dubuque Bridge.

Illinois

In the state of Illinois, US 20 begins in East Dubuque, following southeastward along the Mississippi River, and continues into the very hilly Driftless Area of northwest Illinois through Galena and Elizabeth. The highway then transitions eastward from the Driftless Area to the Interior Plains near Stockton. The road continues as a bypass north of Freeport, and then runs as a freeway along the southern fringe of Rockford. From Rockford to Chicago, Illinois, US 20 is a mixture of four-lane expressway, four-lane limited access freeway, and winding two-lane surface road. It is signed as "General U.S. Grant Highway" after Ulysses S. Grant. U.S. 20 runs through the south side of Chicago as 95th Street. US 20 exits Illinois along with US 12 and US 41 as Indianapolis Boulevard south of the Chicago Skyway.

Indiana

In the state of Indiana, US 20 enters from the west beneath the Chicago Skyway with US 12 and US 41. US 20 passes through heavily industrialized northwestern Indiana and is the main east–west artery through Gary. It then parallels US 12 to just west of Michigan City before running due east through  New Carlisle to South Bend. US 20 travels around South Bend and Elkhart on the St. Joseph Valley Parkway, a four-lane limited access freeway, then returns to surface road east of Elkhart. US 20 then passes through LaGrange and Angola, intersecting with I-69 before leaving Indiana just north of the eastern terminus of the Indiana Toll Road.

From Gary to South Bend, US 20 was built as the Dunes Relief Road. During the 1930s and 1940s the Dunes Highway, US 12, was becoming more crowded as housing lots and communities developed in the Indiana Dunes. Today, there are numerous communities along US 20 and the lakefront, including Gary, Portage, Burns Harbor, Porter, Chesterton, Pines, and Michigan City.

Most notably, the route is one of the main access roads to Indiana Dunes National Park.

Ohio

US 20 enters Ohio from Indiana just west of Columbia and traverses east through Pioneer and Alvordton to Fayette. It continues east through Oakshade, Assumption and becomes five-lane, non-limited access roadway into Sylvania to Toledo, and then turns south until into the Toledo suburb of Maumee. After Maumee, US 20 crosses Maumee River curving back east becoming 2 lanes through Perrysburg to Woodville, where it becomes a four-lane, non-limited access highway. It bypasses Fremont while concurrent with US 6, State Route 53, and State Route 19, and then travels through the northern edge of Clyde and the downtown area of Bellevue, where it is joined by State Route 18. From there the four-lane highway continues through Monroeville and bypasses Norwalk, then becomes a two-lane highway from there to Oberlin. Continuing east, US 20 traverses through Elyria, North Ridgeville, Westlake, Rocky River, Lakewood and Cleveland, where it goes right through Public Square. East of Cleveland US 20 follows the southern shore of Lake Erie, following Euclid Avenue from Public Square, and traverses Euclid, Wickliffe, where it intersects with I-90, Mentor, Painesville, Madison, Geneva, Ashtabula and crosses into Pennsylvania at Conneaut.

Pennsylvania

US 20 appears as West Ridge Road eastward from the Ohio border through Springfield, Girard, Fairview and Millcreek townships. At the intersection with Pennsylvania Route 832, just outside the Erie city limits, it becomes West 26th Street. After it reaches city center at the intersection with State Street, it becomes East 26th Street. It turns sharply northward as Broad Street at the Bayfront Connector, then turns east again as Buffalo Road through Wesleyville and Harborcreek Township. Buffalo Road turns sharply northward at the town of Harborcreek. US 20 intersects with Pennsylvania Route 955 and resumes its eastward journey. At North East Township, US 20 becomes West Main Road. Within the town limits, it becomes West Main Street until it reaches the town center at its intersection with Pennsylvania Route 89, where it becomes East Main Street. Outside the town limits it becomes East Main Road until it reaches Pennsylvania's border with New York.

New York

In New York, US 20 runs roughly parallel to the New York State Thruway (I-90) throughout the state. US 20 runs across the rural Cherry Valley Turnpike between Skaneateles and Albany. US 20 was also known as the Boston-Buffalo highway prior to the construction of the New York Thruway and Massachusetts Turnpike.

Massachusetts

In Massachusetts, US 20 runs near I-90 Mass Pike, intersecting it directly at exit 10 and indirectly at exit 94.

In part of Berkshire County, US 20 runs north–south as it runs concurrently with US 7. It is known as the "Jacob's Ladder Trail" as it crosses the Berkshire Hills between Lee in Berkshire County and Chester in Hampden County. From Chester to Westfield, US 20 and the Boston and Albany Railroad follow the Westfield River down to the broad valley of the Connecticut River.

In Springfield, US 20 runs concurrently with I-291 between Plainfield Street and Page Boulevard; it follows Boston Road as it leaves Springfield and travels through the town of Wilbraham, eventually becoming Main Street in Palmer.

In Shrewsbury, US 20 is called "Hartford Turnpike". In Northborough, and Worcester it is called "Southwest Cutoff", until it merges with the original Boston Post Road in Northborough (Southwest Cutoff and West Main Street). Southwest Cutoff was created at the turn of the century to bypass truck traffic around Shrewsbury center as well as connecting to the Boston and Worcester Turnpike.

In parts of eastern Massachusetts, US 20 follows the route of the old Boston Post Road and passes by Longfellow's Wayside Inn, in Sudbury, the oldest continually operated Inn in America. In 1926, after engineers determined that heavy truck traffic on the Boston Post Road was damaging the foundations of the Inn, Henry Ford, then owner and proprietor, ordered the construction of the mile-and-a-half-long Route 20 bypass. Upon its completion on December 11, 1928, he sold it to the Commonwealth of Massachusetts for $1 and never cashed the check. According to the Boston Herald the by-pass cost Ford $288,000, equivalent to roughly $4.7 million in 2021. The original route of US 20 is now called Wayside Inn Road.

US 20 continues from Sudbury through Wayland, Weston, Waltham, Watertown and then into Boston through Allston and Fenway–Kenmore. U.S. Route 20's official eastern terminus is in Kenmore Square at the intersection of Commonwealth Avenue, Beacon Street, and Brookline Avenue, where the alignment becomes Massachusetts Route 2. Route 2 continues for a short distance where it terminates at Massachusetts Route 28.

History
 Before the U.S. Highway System, the route in New England and New York was designated as New England Interstate Route 5 (NE-5), part of the New England Interstate Route system that existed between 1922 and 1927. Around 1923, from Springfield to Pittsfield, NE-5 was known as "Jacob's Ladder", and from Boston to Albany, the "Hubway". When US 20 was first commissioned, it took over the entirety of NE-5.

Historic termini
Until 1940, the western endpoint of US 20 was the east entrance to Yellowstone National Park.

Historic routes
Between Fort Dodge, Iowa, and Dubuque, Iowa, the route has been upgraded to four lanes, the last link of this completed in 2003. Much of the old route is a few miles north of the present route except between I-35 and Waterloo. There, the old route is farther north, going through Iowa Falls, Aplington, and the north side of Cedar Falls along what is now Iowa Highway 57.

From just west of South Bend, Indiana, to the St. Joseph – Elkhart county line, the old route of US 20 through St. Joseph County is now Business US 20. In Elkhart County, its old route is now classified as a county road and is simply called Old US 20. The St. Joseph Valley Parkway is the present route of US 20 in the South Bend – Elkhart Area.

From 1930 to 1933, US 20 followed what are now Massachusetts Route 67 and Massachusetts Route 9 from Worcester to Palmer via Shrewsbury and Northborough.

The 1953 Massachusetts Department of Public Works Master Plan would have relocated US 20 between Palmer, Massachusetts and either West Springfield, Massachusetts or Westfield, Massachusetts along the right-of-way now used by the Massachusetts Turnpike, but this was never implemented.

Until 1970–72, US 20 followed an old route through downtown Springfield—Boston Road and State Street—crossing the Connecticut River via the older Memorial Bridge (now Massachusetts Route 147). The construction of I-291 prompted a change. US 20 now crosses from West Springfield at the North End Bridge, and is co-signed with I-291 until Page Boulevard, where it heads back to Boston Road via the former route of 20A.

In 2012, the Historic US Route 20 Association was formed to identify, promote and preserve the history of the route and original alignments that were once signed "Route 20" from Boston to Newport.

Historic names
The portion of US 20 eastward from Illinois generally follows the path of the Yellowstone Trail.
In Massachusetts, US 20 follows the Boston Post Road in Wayland and Sudbury.
In the state of New York, part of US 20 follows the old Cherry Valley Turnpike and is still referred to by that name in some places.
From Buffalo westward to Cleveland, Ohio, US 20 follows the path of the Buffalo Stage Road.

Between Fremont, Ohio and Perrysburg, Ohio, the road dates back to the late 1830s. It was known then as the Maumee and Western Reserve Road. Nicknamed "Mud Pike" and earned a reputation as "The worst road on the continent" for the mudholes that would trap wagon wheels and slow draft animals. Travelers sometimes would take three days to travel . It is still signed as Maumee St. in and near Angola, IN.
Through western Indiana, US 20 was built as the Dunes Relief Road, as it bypassed the heavily traveled Dunes Highway.
Northwest of Chicago it is called Ulysses S. Grant Highway.
On March 25, 2019, Idaho officially labeled their section of US 20 as the Idaho Medal of Honor Highway in honor of 48 Medal of Honor Recipients with strong Idaho attachments.

Major intersections
Western segment
Oregon
  at West Olive Street in Newport
  in Albany
  in Bend
  in Riley. The highways travel concurrently to northeast of Burns.
  in Vale. The highways travel concurrently to Mountain Home, Idaho.
Idaho
  north of Parma. The highways travel concurrently to southeast of Parma.
  north of Caldwell. The highways travel concurrently to Caldwell.
  in Boise. The highways travel concurrently through the city.
  in Boise. The highways travel concurrently to Mountain Home.
  in Carey. US 20/US 26 travel concurrently to northwest of Atomic City. US 20/US 93 travel concurrently to Arco.
  in Idaho Falls. The highways travel concurrently through the city.
Montana
  at Firehole Avenue in West Yellowstone. The highways travel concurrently to the West Entrance to Yellowstone National Park.

Yellowstone National Park segment (unofficial designation)
  travels concurrently from the park's West Entrance to West Thumb.
  north-northwest of West Thumb. The highways travel concurrently to West Thumb.
  in West Thumb. The highways travel concurrently to the park's East Entrance.

Eastern segment
Wyoming
  at the East Entrance to Yellowstone National Park, southeast of Pahaska Tepee. US 14/US 20 travel concurrently to Greybull. US 16/US 20 travel concurrently to Worland.
  west-northwest of Greybull
  in Shoshoni. The highways travel concurrently to Orin.
  at Events Drive on the Casper–Hartrandt city line. I-25/US 20 travel concurrently into Casper proper. US 20/US 87 travel concurrently to Orin.
  in Casper
  southeast of Glenrock. The highways travel concurrently to Orin.
  in Orin. US 18/US 20 travel concurrently to Lusk.
  in Lusk. The highways travel concurrently through the town.
Nebraska
  west of Chadron. The highways travel concurrently to Chadron.
  in Valentine. The highways travel concurrently to south-southeast of Valentine.
  west-northwest of Long Pine. The highways travel concurrently to Bassett.
  in O'Neill. The highways travel concurrently through the city.
  in O'Neill. US 20/US 275 travel concurrently to southeast of Inman.
  west-southwest of Randolph
  in South Sioux City. I-129/US 20 travel concurrently to Sioux City, Iowa. US 20/US 75 travel concurrently to the Woodbury–Concord township line.
Iowa
  in Sioux City
  in Holstein. The highways travel concurrently to southeast of Holstein.
  in Boyer Valley Township.
  in Elkhorn Township
  in Liberty Township
  in Rose Grove Township
  in Ellis Township
  in Waterloo
  in Waterloo. I-380/US 20 travel concurrently to Poyner Township.
  in Dyersville. The highway travels concurrently to Dubuque.
  in Dubuque
Illinois
  in Rockford. The highways travel concurrently to Cherry Valley.
  north-northeast of Hampshire
  in Addison
  in Elmhurst. The highways travel concurrently through the city.
  on the Stone Park-Melrose Park city line. US 12/US 20 travel concurrently to East Chicago, Indiana. US 20/US 45 travel concurrently to west of the Palos Hills-Hickory Hills city line.
  on the Bellwood-Hillside-Westchester city line
  in La Grange
  on the Countryside-Hodgkins city line
  in Willow Springs
  on the Hickory Hills-Bridgeview city line
  in Chicago. The highways travel concurrently to Whiting.
Indiana
  northwest of Whiting
  on the Hammond-Gary city line. The highways travel concurrently into Gary proper.
  in Gary
  in Gary
  in Burns Harbor
  in Michigan City
  east-southeast of Michigan City
  east-southeast of Michigan City
  in South Bend. The highways travel concurrently through the city.
  in Elkhart
  in Jackson Township
Ohio
  in Mill Creek Township. The highways travel concurrently to Gorham Township.
  in Sylvania
  in Maumee
  in Maumee
  in Perrysburg. US 20/US 23 travel concurrently to the Troy-Woodville township line.
  in Sandusky Township. The highways travel concurrently to Fremont.
  in Norwalk
  in Lakewood. The highways travel concurrently to Cleveland.
  in Cleveland. US 20/US 422 travel concurrently for one block.
  in East Cleveland. The highways travel concurrently to Euclid.
  on the Euclid-Wickliffe city line
Pennsylvania
  in Springfield Township
  in Erie
  in Erie
  east-northeast of North East
New York
  in Hanover
  east of Avon
  south-southwest of LaFayette
  south of LaFayette
  in McKownville
  in Albany
  in Albany. The highways travel concurrently to Schodack.
  in East Greenbush
  in Schodack
Massachusetts
  in Pittsfield. The highways travel concurrently to Lenox.
  in Lee
  in Westfield. The highways travel concurrently through the city.
  in West Springfield
  in Springfield
  in Springfield. The highways travel concurrently through the city.
  in Sturbridge
  in Auburn
  in Marlborough
  in Waltham
  in Boston

See also

Massachusetts Route 20A
U.S. Route 20A in New York
U.S. Route 20A in Ohio
U.S. Route 20 Business—Sioux City, Iowa; also passes through South Sioux City, Nebraska
U.S. Route 20 Business—Fort Dodge, Iowa
 U.S. Route 120, became Pennsylvania Route 120 in 1967
 U.S. Route 220
 U.S. Route 320 (now decommissioned, was part of the old Route 26)
 U.S. Route 420 (part of U.S. Route 14 Alternate)

References

Further reading

External links

 Galena Bypass project homepage
 Illinois Highway Ends: US 20
 Indiana Highway Ends: US 20
 In Search of...U.S. Route 20 in Ohio by Michael G. Buettner, February 2006
 US 20 Travelogue in New York at Empire State Roads
 "On Route 20, Where the Past Is Present": August 11, 2006, article in The New York Times Escapes section.
 Flickr Group for photos taken along US 20
 Endpoints of US 20 at USends.com
 Twenty West: The Great Road Across America—book about US 20
 Historic US Route 20 Association Site dedicated to the preservation and promotion of Historic US Route 20

 
20
20